Kevin Vincent Muscat (born 7 August 1973) is an Australian former association football player and the current manager of Yokohama F. Marinos. As a player, he represented the Australia national team at international level winning 46 caps and scoring 10 goals between 1994 and 2006. 

After beginning his professional career in the Australian National Soccer League with Sunshine George Cross in 1989, Muscat played eight seasons in the United Kingdom with Crystal Palace, Wolverhampton Wanderers, Rangers and Millwall. He returned to Australia in 2005 for the first time since leaving South Melbourne in 1996 to captain Melbourne Victory in the inaugural season of the A-league. His playing style was brutal defence with little regard for accumulating yellow cards or avoiding injury to opponents, a reputation that was so strong that while at Rangers he was never picked for an Old Firm derby due to the perceived risk that his explosive temper causing a major incident or costing Rangers the match by being sent off. He ended his A-League career in disgrace after deliberately injuring Adrian Zahra with a disgraceful tackle that was widely describe as an assault by the football media.

Muscat retired from professional football in March 2011 after Melbourne Victory's 2011 AFC Champions League campaign, citing his growing frustration at his inability to keep pace with the game. Muscat briefly rejoined his former club Sunshine George Cross for part of the 2011 Victorian State League Division 1 season.

During his international career, Muscat represented the Australia U-20 side at the 1991 FIFA World Youth Championship in Portugal and the 1993 FIFA World Youth Championship in Australia. He represented the Australia U-23 side at the 1996 Summer Olympics. After making his full international debut for Australia in September 1994 against Kuwait, Muscat represented the national side at the 1997 FIFA Confederations Cup, 2000 OFC Nations Cup, 2001 FIFA Confederations Cup and the 2005 FIFA Confederations Cup.

After several seasons as an assistant coach, Muscat was appointed head coach at Melbourne Victory in October 2013. He has coached Victory to the 2014–15 A-League Premiership, the 2014–15 A-League Championship and success in the 2015 FFA Cup. He left the role in 2019.

Club career

Early life 
Born in Crawley, West Sussex, in England from Maltese descent, Muscat began his career as a junior at Australian National Soccer League (NSL) club Sunshine George Cross, making his first senior appearances for the club in the 1989/90 season t 16-years old. He moved from Sunshine to the Australian Institute of Sport in 1990 and was awarded the Weinstein Medal as the Victorian Junior Player of the year.

South Melbourne FC 
He continued playing in the NSL for Heidelberg United in the 1991-92 season before earning a move to Australian powerhouse South Melbourne Hellas. Mostly deployed as a left-back, Muscat's aggressiveness and defensive awareness made him a standout performer in the league which attracted international attention. During his time at South, he was called up to the Olyroos.

In 1995-96 he trialled at Sheffield United under manager Dave Bassett but decided to stay at South Melbourne. After further impressive performances with South Melbourne and the Olyroos, he attracted the interest of many overseas clubs. His performances for South culminated in a senior international call-up by Eddie Thompson for the Australian National Team. By August 1996 Bassett had taken the helm at Crystal Palace and signed Muscat to the south London club for £35,000 from South Melbourne Hellas. In his departure Muscat thanked the South Melbourne fans for their support towards him.

Crystal Palace 
Muscat was part of the Palace team that subsequently won promotion to the English Premier League, defeating Sheffield United in the 1997 play-off final at Wembley. Muscat obtained a reputation as a 'hard man' at Palace and was constantly targeted by the media and opposing fans for his style of play. He made nine Premier League appearances for Palace before moving to First Division Wolverhampton Wanderers for £200,000 in October 1997.

Wolverhampton Wanderers 
Muscat remained at Wolves for five seasons before moving to Scotland to join Rangers on a free transfer in July 2002.

Rangers 
He was part of the Rangers squad which won a treble of domestic trophies in 2002–03. He would end his career in Scotland having played 22 times for Rangers.

Millwall 
Muscat's final British club was Millwall, for whom he played from 2003 to 2005. In 2004, he captained Millwall to the FA Cup Final for the first time in their history.

He missed the final itself after suffering a knee ligament injury in the semi-final against Sunderland, although the Millwall manager Dennis Wise insisted on him being presented with a medal. He left Millwall to return to Australia to become Melbourne Victory's inaugural captain in the 2005–06 season. Under Victory manager Ernie Merrick, Muscat, a defender for virtually his entire career, moved to midfield for the 2006–07 season. He remained the captain until 2011.

In February 2011, Muscat announced his intention to retire from club football after the conclusion of the 2011 Asian Champions League. His decision to finish was fast-tracked by an infamous tackle he committed in a Melbourne derby on 22 January 2011, which resulted in a season-ending eight-week ban from the A-League. Muscat played out his competitive career in the 2011 AFC Champions League under the captaincy of centre-back Adrian Leijer, despite having previously referred to the competition as "not all that enjoyable". Muscat regained the captaincy for his farewell match in Melbourne, a 1–1 draw against J-League side Gamba Osaka. Muscat scored on his return to Sunshine George Cross in a 3–1 loss to Altona Magic in August 2011.

International career
Muscat represented Australia at Under-20 level at the World Youth Cup finals in Portugal in 1991 and Australia in 1993, and at Under-23 level at the 1996 Atlanta Olympic Games. He made his full international debut in September 1994 against Kuwait, and went on to make 51 appearances for the national team, including Confederations Cup tournaments in 1997, 2001 and 2005. Muscat captained the national team five times from April 2001 and scored a critical penalty in the 1–0 home leg of Australia's unsuccessful play-off against Uruguay for a place in the finals of the 2002 FIFA World Cup.

Muscat was dropped from the squad when coach Guus Hiddink took over in 2005 and played no part in Australia's subsequent qualification for the 2006 World Cup, but was recalled later in 2006 by Graham Arnold and captained Australia in its 2–0 Asian Cup qualifier against Kuwait. In 2008, newly appointed coach Pim Verbeek selected Muscat in a squad of 22 A-League based players to prepare for 2010 FIFA World Cup qualifiers, but he did not play in any subsequent fixtures.

Reputation

In 1996, Muscat was sent off in his first season in the UK in a match involving Crystal Palace and Norwich City after body checking Norwich player, Darren Eadie which then sparked a 21-man melee where punches were thrown. Two other players were also sent off in the incident.

Muscat was branded a "lowlife" and a "nobody" by ex-England striker Ian Wright, then of Nottingham Forest, in September 1999. Wright claimed he was about to shoot when he heard Dougie Freedman, Forest's other striker, shout "leave it". Wright stepped over the ball to allow Freedman to hit it, but instead Muscat (who had, according to Wright, merely impersonated Freedman) appeared to clear the ball.

Muscat was dubbed the "most hated man in football" by then Birmingham City player Martin Grainger in 2000 after a reckless tackle against international teammate, Stan Lazaridis. He seriously injured both Craig Bellamy and Christophe Dugarry, the latter in a friendly international between Australia and France in 2001 with a sliding tackle from behind. The French manager Roger Lemerre dubbed the tackle "an act of brutality". It was speculated that Muscat's temperament was the reason he was never selected for inclusion in an Old Firm derby during his time at Rangers.

In March 2002, Muscat was sent off after nine minutes in a match against Grimsby Town for elbowing Grimsby striker Michael Boulding. Wolves lost the match and Muscat was suspended for three matches following the incident.

In 2003, after only three weeks since signing for Millwall, Muscat was fined and reprimanded by Millwall after a match against Watford where he gave away a penalty and was sent off for stamping on Watford's Danny Webber. Millwall chief executive, Ken Brown, formally warned Muscat that he would be sacked if he did not "clean up his act." "Kevin's actions were totally unacceptable. We have made him aware that such behavior will not be tolerated. Any repeat of such a deliberate, unprovoked, off-the-ball incident will result in his instant dismissal."

In 2004, a lawsuit on Muscat brought by former Charlton Athletic player Matty Holmes resulted in a settlement of £250,000 plus costs in favour of Holmes, bringing the estimated settlement to around £750,000. Holmes had to have four operations on his leg following a tackle by Muscat in 1998, and there were initial fears that his leg might have to be amputated. The claim was settled at the High Court without any admission of liability. In a League Cup tie while at Millwall, he grabbed the throat of Liverpool striker Milan Baroš. Also in 2004, Iwan Roberts admitted he deliberately stamped on Muscat in a match against Norwich City in revenge for his attempt to injure Craig Bellamy in 1999. Roberts was subsequently fined and suspended by The Football Association for his comments.

In March later that year whilst playing for Millwall, Muscat was red carded and suspended for five games for a challenge from behind on Sheffield United player, Ashley Ward which ignited an on-field brawl that involved most players from both teams. Sheffield United went on to win the game 2-1 despite having goalkeeper Paddy Kenny sent off alongside Muscat, and as Millwall players were walking off the pitch, Blades manager Neil Warnock was seen shaking players’ hands while also saying “serves you right for f*cking Muscat, that” - one of which being former Chelsea assistant manager, Jody Morris.

In December 2005, he was the first A-League player to appear before a FFA disciplinary hearing and was subsequently suspended for two matches for "violent conduct". At an A-league game in October 2006 Muscat clashed with then Adelaide United coach John Kosmina, knocking Kosmina from his chair while retrieving the ball. Kosmina responded by grabbing Muscat by the throat, an action for which Kosmina was suspended for four matches.

Muscat's dominant personality and aggressive style did win some admirers in the A-League, with former England international Terry Butcher stating "Every manager in the A-League would love to have Kevin, and I'm no exception".

In February 2009, Muscat "escaped" further sanction by the FFA for stamping on Adelaide United defender, Daniel Mullen, while challenging for the ball. Due to the referee seeing the incident during the match, as according to A-League protocol, the Match Review Panel had no authority to intervene any further.

In January 2010, Muscat was suspended for two games for elbowing Gold Coast United midfielder, Jason Culina, in an off the ball incident.

In October 2010, Manchester United winger Ashley Young recalled he was threatened by Muscat during his first professional match as an 18-year-old. "Kevin Muscat said he would break my legs if I went past him," said Young. Their meeting occurred as they were warming up for an encounter between Watford F.C. and Millwall back in September 2003, but Muscat was sent off for stamping on Watford's Danny Webber before Young came on as substitute for Watford.

In January 2011, Muscat was sent off for elbowing Adelaide United midfielder, Adam Hughes, in the face while following through on a challenge for the ball.

In his first match back from suspension, Muscat was then suspended for eight matches following a tackle on Melbourne Heart player Adrian Zahra in a Melbourne Derby. The tackle was widely condemned in Australia and around the world, with former Socceroo Mark Bosnich calling it a "disgrace".

In a professional career spanning 19 years from 1992 to 2011, Muscat received 123 yellow cards and 12 red cards.

In December 2013, the Spanish football website El Gol Digital named Muscat as football's dirtiest ever player.

Managerial career

For the final two years of his playing career, Muscat served as a playing assistant coach under Ernie Merrick. Due to a clause in his contract with Melbourne Victory, which makes him an assistant coach at Melbourne Victory for the next two years after his retirement, Kevin Muscat began serving as an assistant coach at Melbourne Victory shortly after his retirement from football. After Mehmet Durakovic was sacked after a poor run of results, Muscat was appointed as the caretaker coach of Melbourne Victory until he was succeeded by former Ipswich Town and Queens Park Rangers manager Jim Magilton. In his only game as Victory manager, Melbourne Victory defeated the Newcastle Jets 2–1, with two own goals from defender Byun Sung-Hwan.

After an underwhelming tenure as Melbourne Victory manager, in which he recorded just two wins in 12 matches, Magilton left the Victory at the conclusion of the 2011–12 A-League with Brisbane Roar manager Ange Postecoglou taking the reins at Victory for the beginning of the 2012–13 A-League season, signing a three-year contract. After a relatively successful first season in charge of the Victory, in which the Victory finished 3rd on the A-League ladder, and made it to the semi-finals of the A-League finals, Postecoglou was appointed the new manager of Australia, with Postecoglou departing the Victory after their Round 3 win against Postecoglou's former club, Brisbane Roar. Having served under four managers since his appointment as assistant coach, Muscat was subsequently appointed as Postecoglou's successor on 31 October 2013, three games into the 2013–14 season, on a two-year contract.

In his first full season as Melbourne Victory manager, and just his second year in charge of the club, Muscat guided Melbourne Victory to an A-League premiership-championship double in 2015, the Victory's third A-League premiership-championship double. Under Muscat, the Victory finished with a regular season record of 15 wins 8 draws and 4 losses, with a final points tally of 53 points, three points ahead of second placed Sydney FC and a final goal difference of +25, the highest of any club that season. Muscat guided the Victory to a 3–0 win over Melbourne City in the semi-finals, before recording a 3–0 win over Sydney FC at AAMI Park.

In June 2017, Muscat, along with Darren Davies and Ross Aloisi, were called up by Ange Postecoglou to serve as members of Australia's coaching staff for the 2017 FIFA Confederations Cup.

On 5 June 2020 Muscat was announced as the manager for Belgian First Division A team Sint-Truidense V.V., however just six months later he was sacked due to poor results.

Muscat was appointed manager of Yokohama F. Marinos in July 2021, succeeding Ange Postecoglou as he had at Melbourne Victory, and won the J1 League title in 2022.

Managerial statistics

International statistics

Summary
Source:

International goals

Honours

Player
Australia
 FIFA Confederations Cup: 1997 (Runners-Up), 2001 (Third Place)
 OFC Nations Cup: 2000, 2004

Crystal Palace
Football League First Division play-offs: 1997

Melbourne Victory
 A-League Championship: 2006–07, 2008–09
 A-League Premiership: 2006–07, 2008–09
 A-League Pre-Season Challenge Cup: 2008–09

Rangers
 SPL Championship: 2002–03
 Scottish Cup: 2002–03
 Scottish League Cup: 2002–03

Millwall
 FA Cup: 2004 (Runners-Up)

South Melbourne FC 

 National Soccer League: Premiers 1992-1993
 Dockerty Cup: 1993, 1995
 NSL Cup: 1995-96

Individual
 FFV Weinstein Medal: 1990
 NSL Young Player of the Year: 1993
 NSL Papasavas Medal (U-21): 1991–92
 Melbourne Victory Medal: 2005–06, 2006–07, 2008–09
 A-League PFA Team of the Season: 2008–09, 2009–10
 PFA A-League Team of the Decade (2005–15)

Manager
Melbourne Victory
 A-League Championship: 2014–15, 2017–18
 A-League Premiership: 2014–15
 FFA Cup: 2015

Yokohama F. Marinos
J1 League: 2022
Japanese Super Cup: 2023

Individual
 A-League Coach of the Year: 2014–15

References

External links
 Melbourne Victory profile
 OzFootball profile
 

1973 births
Living people
Sportspeople from Crawley
Footballers from West Sussex
Australian soccer players
Australian soccer coaches
Association football defenders
Crystal Palace F.C. players
Melbourne Victory FC players
Millwall F.C. players
Rangers F.C. players
South Melbourne FC players
Wolverhampton Wanderers F.C. players
Caroline Springs George Cross FC players
A-League Men players
Premier League players
English Football League players
Scottish Premier League players
National Soccer League (Australia) players
Australian expatriate soccer players
Expatriate footballers in Scotland
Expatriate football managers in Belgium
Soccer players from Melbourne
Australian expatriate sportspeople in Scotland
Australian expatriate sportspeople in Belgium
Australia international soccer players
Olympic soccer players of Australia
Footballers at the 1996 Summer Olympics
1997 FIFA Confederations Cup players
2000 OFC Nations Cup players
2001 FIFA Confederations Cup players
2005 FIFA Confederations Cup players
Australian Institute of Sport soccer players
A-League Men managers
J1 League managers
Australian expatriate soccer coaches
Australian people of Maltese descent
English people of Maltese descent
English emigrants to Australia
Melbourne Victory FC managers
Sint-Truidense V.V. managers
Yokohama F. Marinos managers
Expatriate football managers in Japan
Australian expatriate sportspeople in Japan